Old Union Fountain is a fountain on the Stanford University campus in Stanford, California, United States. The fountain exhibits traditional mission style architecture, and is one of several on campus used in the tradition of "fountain hopping".

References

Fountains in California
Outdoor sculptures in California
Stanford University buildings and structures